Waad or WAAD may refer to:
World Autism Awareness Day, annually on 2 April, declared by the United Nations
Wa'ad or National Democratic Action Society, Bahrain's largest leftist political party

Persons with the given name
Waad Al Bahri (born 1981), Syrian singer
Waad Hirmez (born 1961), Iraqi-American soccer player
Waad Al-Kateab (born 1993), Syrian filmmaker and journalist

Persons with the surname
Armagil Waad (  1511–1568), English civil servant and parliamentarian
William Waad (1546–1623), English statesman and diplomat